Teriomima williami, the Dondo buff, is a butterfly in the family Lycaenidae. It is found in Mozambique. The habitat consists of coastal forests.

Adults have been recorded on wing in April, May, July, August and September

Etymology
The species is named for William Henry "Bill" Henning.

References

Endemic fauna of Mozambique
Butterflies described in 2004
Poritiinae